Božinovski(also Bozhinovski or Bozinovski) is a Macedonian surname:

Vlado Bozinovski (born 1964), Australian footballer.
Vasko Božinovski (born 1975), Macedonian footballer.

The Bulgarian form is Bozhinov.

Surnames
Macedonian-language surnames